Ganesh Thakur  is an Indian professional footballer who plays as a midfielder for Delhi United in the I-League 2nd Division.

Career
Thakur started his career with Sesa Football Academy in Goa before moving to Sporting Clube de Goa in 2014. Initially, Thakur played with the Sporting Goa youth sides in the Goan under-20 league and the I-League U19. Eventually, Thakur began making appearances for the senior side in the Goa Professional League in 2015.

On 25 January 2016, Thakur made his professional debut for Sporting Goa in the I-League against Aizawl. He came on as a late substitute for Glan Martins as Sporting Goa won 2–0.

Career statistics

References

Living people
Indian footballers
Sporting Clube de Goa players
Association football midfielders

Goa Professional League players
I-League players
Year of birth missing (living people)